Michelle Anthony is an American singer-songwriter.

Biography
Michelle Anthony was born in Kansas City, Missouri, and grew up in Overland Park, Kansas (a suburb of Kansas City). She began playing piano by ear at age three, taught by her mother, a piano teacher, and father, a classically trained pianist. She later took up bass guitar to fill a void for the rock band she played with in high school.

She moved to Milwaukee, Wisconsin, to attend Marquette University and remained in Wisconsin after graduating. In college, Anthony aspired to be an agent, facilitating bookings and promotions for other bands. At Marquette she was a member of the band Tempus Fugit.

She moved to Austin, Texas, in 2005 and to Overland Park, Missouri, in 2012.

Capital 8 

Anthony was a member of the popular Milwaukee rock band Capital 8 (sometimes stylized as "C8") from 1999 to 2004. Capital 8 released two albums, Reason and Payola. Anthony was featured prominently on Payola, and her performance was singled out as one of the highlights of the album.

When Capital 8 disbanded, Anthony formed the band Stick Pony. They eventually became her supporting band when she began her solo career.

Stand Fall Repeat 
Anthony released her debut album Stand Fall Repeat in 2004. It was critically acclaimed, with Anthony acknowledged by Fox News to be "taking off." The album was recorded over nine days in October 2003 in Chicago, Illinois.

The album was co-produced by Jay Bennett (formerly of Wilco), Anthony, and her husband, Scott. Anthony was introduced to Bennett when contributing vocals to West of Rome's album Drunk Tank Decoy and recruited him to collaborate on her debut album. Anthony was also featured on Bennett's album, The Beloved Enemy.

In October 2004, Anthony was featured on National Public Radio's Mountain Stage in support of the album, also featuring KD Lang and Bruce Cockburn.

frozenstarpalace 

Anthony released her sophomore record, frozenstarpalace, in October 2006.

Tornadoes 

Anthony released her third album, Tornadoes, in August 2010. It was well received by critics. During recording, the working title of the album was Songs from the Old Mill.

She released the instrumental tracks from Tornadoes on her SoundCloud account in 2003.

Other music 

In 2003, Anthony collaborated with Afrodisiac Soundsystem on a trip hop version of the Christmas carol "The First Noel." It was featured on the album Christmas Eclectic.

In 2006, Anthony contributed the song "White Lies" to the compilation album Voices and Faces Project, Vol. 1. It was a benefit album for the Voices and Faces Project, a non-profit whose purpose is to share the stories of survivors of sexual violence with the public.

In 2008, Anthony contributed a cover of the R.E.M. song "You Are The Everything" for the album Undiscovered.

In the winter of 2010, Anthony released the holiday-themed single "Snow."

In 2011, Anthony contributed piano and vocals to The Silos album Florizona.

Anthony also released a demo track in 2011 entitled "Love-Love-Love" for free download on her SoundCloud page.

In 2013, Anthony revealed two previously unreleased tracks from the frozenstarpalace sessions for free download on her SoundCloud page: "Let It Rest" and "Sorry."

Anthony was featured on the 2014 Woolridge Brothers cover album Cover Up. She covered their song "Unbelievable Truth." She later released a stripped-down version of the song on her blog to illustrate the recording process of the song.

Featured in 

Anthony's music is featured in the movie Black Cloud as well as in the television programs The Wonderfalls, Roswell, Pimp My Ride, and Making the Band.

Personal life
Anthony is married to her musical collaborator, Scott Anthony. They met at a party in Kansas City and discovered that they had similar musical tastes and both wanted to start bands. They have two children.

During her first pregnancy, Anthony was diagnosed with HELLP syndrome, which was life-threatening. She credits the ordeal and recovery for giving her clarity and gratitude, which were expressed in part on her Tornadoes album.

Discography

Studio albums

Compilation albums

Non-Album singles

References

External links
 

Musicians from Kansas City, Missouri
American women singer-songwriters
Marquette University alumni
Year of birth missing (living people)
Living people
People from Overland Park, Kansas
21st-century American women
Singer-songwriters from Missouri
Singer-songwriters from Kansas